Liu Ruozhuang (25 May 1925 - 8 October 2020) was a Chinese physical chemist and academician of the Chinese Academy of Sciences (CAS). He was the founder of computational chemistry in China.

Biography
Liu was born in Beijing, on May 25, 1925. In 1943, he entered Fu Jen Catholic University, majoring in chemistry at the Department of Chemistry. After graduating in 1947, he did his postgraduate work at Peking University. In 1949, he published his first research paper "Modified Troutons Rule" in the Journal of the Chinese Chemical Society. In June 1950, he began to study quantum chemistry under the supervision of Tang Aoqing. In September 1951, he was hired as a lecturer at Peking University and Fu Jen Catholic University. In 1952, after the adjustment of colleges and departments, he taught at Beijing Normal University, where he was promoted to associate professor in September 1956 and to full professor in July 1979. He joined the Jiusan Society in 1956. In 1978, he founded the Laboratory of Quantum Chemistry at Beijing Normal University. He joined the Communist Party of China in 1984. He became a visiting professor at the National Autonomous University of Mexico in the following year. He died in Beijing, on October 8, 2020.

Selected papers

Honours and awards
 1982 State Natural Science Award (First Class)
 1989 State Natural Science Award (Third Class)
 1999 Member of the Chinese Academy of Sciences (CAS)

References

1925 births
2020 deaths
Chemists from Beijing
Catholic University of Peking alumni
Peking University alumni
Academic staff of Beijing Normal University
Members of the Chinese Academy of Sciences